is a 10.8 km railway line owned by the Kumamoto Electric Railway, serving Kumamoto City and Kōshi, Kumamoto Prefecture, Japan. The line runs northward from Kami-Kumamoto Station on the Kagoshima Main Line, operated by JR Kyushu, terminating at Miyoshi Station.

Previously, the line ran as far as Kikuchi, Kumamoto, an onsen resort town. However, ticket sales were replaced with road traffic on Japan National Route 387, and the section between Miyoshi and Kikuchi ceased operations on February 16, 1986.

Operations
The line is electrified  with overhead lines and is single-tracked for the entire line. Passing loops are located at Horikawa Station and Kuroishi Station. Kita-Kumamoto Station has a passing loop for trains continuing on the Fujisaki Line

Two types of passenger services run on the line. The first runs between Kami-Kumamoto Station and Kita-Kumamoto Station, while the second runs between Fujisakigū-mae Station on the Fujisaki Line to Miyoshi Station, running through Kita-Kumamoto. Both types of services stop at every station. Busses operated by the Kumamoto Electric Railway connect Miyoshi with Kikuchi along the abolished track.

Stations

Current stations

Terminated stations

References

Kumamoto Electric Railway Kikuchi Line
Railway lines in Japan
Rail transport in Kumamoto Prefecture
Railway lines opened in 1913
Japanese third-sector railway lines